Coalport or Coal Port, can refer to:

Coalport, a village in Shropshire, England.
Coalport Branch Line, a railway branch line in Shropshire, England.
Coalport Canal, alternate name for a portion of the Shropshire Canal in England.
Coalport China Museum, a museum.
Coalport porcelain, a type of porcelain.
Coalport, Pennsylvania, a borough in Pennsylvania, US.
Coalport, Ohio, former name for the village of Middleport, Ohio, US.
Coalport West railway station, a railway station in Coalport, England.
Coalport/North Clinton, Trenton, New Jersey, a neighborhood in Trenton, New Jersey, US.

See also

 
 
 
 
 Coal (disambiguation)
 Port (disambiguation)
 Coaling station, where a ship refuels its coal bunker
 Coal Harbor (disambiguation)